Robert Minard Garrels (August 24, 1916 – March 8, 1988) was an American geochemist. Garrels applied experimental physical chemistry data and techniques to geology and geochemistry problems. The book Solutions, Minerals, and Equilibria co-authored in 1965 by Garrels and Charles L. Christ revolutionized aqueous geochemistry.

Garrels earned a bachelor's degree in geology from The University of Michigan in 1937. He went on to earn an M.S. degree from Northwestern in 1939, his thesis work was on iron ores of Newfoundland in 1938. His Ph.D was awarded in 1941 based on lab studies of complex formation between lead and chloride ions in aqueous solution.

Life and career

Garrels worked for the U.S. Geological Survey during World War II and returned to teach at Northwestern until 1952. Also in 1952 he published a technical paper, "Origin and Classification of Chemical Sediments in Terms of pH and Oxidation-Reduction Potentials." with W. C. Krumbein, which was to become a classic study of sedimentary rocks from a physical chemistry viewpoint. This and following works revolutionized sedimentary and aqueous geochemistry.

He joined the USGS again for a time, but returned to academia at Harvard in 1955. He became full professor in 1957 and later department chair. His work and the lab he supervised at Harvard produced many classic works including the Solutions, Minerals, and Equilibria text. Here between 1960 and 1962 he along with his colleagues published the classic studies:
"Oxidation of Pyrite by Iron Sulfate Solutions"
"Stability of Some Carbonates at 25°C and One Atmosphere Total Pressure"
"Control of Carbonate Solubility by Carbonate Complexes"
"A Chemical Model for Sea Water at 25°C and One Atmosphere Total Pressure"

He returned to Northwestern in 1965 and conducted influential studies on the silicate and carbonate buffering of seawaters, the genesis of groundwaters and the theoretical treatment of irreversible reactions in geochemical processes.

In 1969 he moved to the Scripps Institution of Oceanography and later to the University of Hawaii. During this time he worked on  thermodynamic properties of silicate minerals and also published  "Cycling of Carbon, Sulfur, and Oxygen through Geologic Time" with Ed Perry in 1974.

In 1974 he returned to Northwestern and published important studies on the sulfur and carbon isotopic compositions of Phanerozoic rocks with Abraham Lerman and Fred MacKenzie.

Garrels had broad interests beyond geology.  He enjoyed travel and wine.  He was athletic, holding the world high jump record for men over 57 years of age.  He was a poet-scientist:

Cycle of Pby Robert M. Garrels

I put some P into the seathe biomass did swell

But settling down soon overcameand P went down toward Hell

From Purgatory soon releasedit moved up to the land

To make a perfect rose for theeto carry in thy hand

But roses wilt and die you knowthen P falls on the ground

Gobbled up as ferric Pa nasty brown compound

The world is moral still you knowand Nature's wheels do grind

Put ferric P into the seaand a rose someday you'll find

He moved to the University of South Florida at St. Petersburg in 1979, holding the St. Petersburg Progress Chair in Marine Science, and spent summers at the Université Louis Pasteur, Strasbourg; the Université Libre, Brussels; and Yale, where he held an adjunct professorship.  During this time he published "The Carbonate–Silicate Geochemical Cycle and Its Effect on Atmospheric Carbon Dioxide over the Past 100 Million Years" in 1983.  This concerned the BLAG model, named for the collaborators including Tony Lasaga and Robert Berner. He continued to be active while fighting cancer, publishing  "Modeling Atmospheric O2 in the Global Sedimentary Redox Cycle" (1986) and "A Model for the Deposition of the Microbanded Precambrian Iron Formations." (1987)

Awards and honors

 1961 - Election to the National Academy of Sciences
 1962 - President of the Geochemical Society
 1966 - Received the Arthur L. Day Medal of the Geological Society of America
 1969 - Honorary doctorate from the Université Libre de Bruxelles
 1973 - Received the V. M. Goldschmidt Award of the Geochemical Society
 1976 - Honorary doctorate from the Université Louis Pasteur, Strasbourg, France
 1978 - Received the Penrose Medal of the Geological Society of America
 1980 - Honorary doctorate from the University of Michigan, Ann Arbor, Michigan, USA
 1981 - Received the Wollaston Medal of the Geological Society of London
 1981 - Received the Roebling Medal of the Mineralogical Society of America

Selected publications
A Textbook of Geology, Harper's Geoscience Series (1951)
Behavior of Colorado Plateau uranium minerals during oxidation U.S. Geological Survey Trace Elements Investigations Report No. 588 (1956)
Mineral Equilibria at Low Temperature and Pressure, Harper (1960)
Solutions, Minerals, and Equilibria with Charles L. Christ (1965) (2nd ed. Freeman Cooper Co, 1982 and revised ed 1990)  (1990 ed.)
Evolution of Sedimentary Rocks with Fred Mackenzie; Norton, (1971)
Water the Web of Life with Cynthia Garrels; Norton (1972)
Chemical cycles and the global environment: Assessing human influences with Cynthia Garrels and F. T. Mackenzie W.; Kaufmann (1975)
Thermodynamic Values at Low Temperature for Natural Inorganic Materials: An Uncritical Summary, with Terri L. Woods; Oxford University Press (1986)

References

External links
Biographical Memoirs V.61 (1992), The National Academies Press, by Robert A. Berner, p 195-212
 Robert M. Garrels Papers, 1938-1992, Northwestern University Archive, Evanston, Illinois

1916 births
1988 deaths
Members of the United States National Academy of Sciences
American geochemists
Wollaston Medal winners
University of Michigan College of Literature, Science, and the Arts alumni
Northwestern University alumni
Harvard University faculty
University of Hawaiʻi faculty
Penrose Medal winners
United States Geological Survey personnel
American physical chemists
Presidents of the Geochemical Society
Recipients of the V. M. Goldschmidt Award